The canton of Isigny-le-Buat is an administrative division of the Manche department, northwestern France. Its borders were modified at the French canton reorganisation which came into effect in March 2015. Its seat is in Isigny-le-Buat.

It consists of the following communes:

Avranches (partly)
Brécey
La Chaise-Baudouin
La Chapelle-Urée
Les Cresnays
Cuves
La Godefroy
Le Grand-Celland
Isigny-le-Buat
Juvigny les Vallées
Lingeard
Les Loges-sur-Brécey
Le Mesnil-Adelée
Le Mesnil-Gilbert
Notre-Dame-de-Livoye
Le Petit-Celland
Reffuveille
Saint-Brice
Saint-Georges-de-Livoye
Saint-Jean-du-Corail-des-Bois
Saint-Laurent-de-Cuves
Saint-Loup
Saint-Michel-de-Montjoie
Saint-Nicolas-des-Bois
Saint-Senier-sous-Avranches
Tirepied-sur-Sée
Vernix

References

Cantons of Manche